(OPU), also abbreviated to , is one of the largest public universities in Japan. The main campus is among big Kofun tombs in Sakai, Osaka.

The university will merge with Osaka City University to form Osaka Metropolitan University (OMU) in April 2022.

History 
OPU was established in 2005 in its current form by integrating three prefectural universities: University of Osaka Prefecture, Osaka Women's University  and Osaka Prefecture College of Nursing.
 In June 2020, OPU announced that it would be merging with Osaka City University to become the University of Osaka. However, after the name was announced on June 26, 2020, Osaka University President released a statement pointing out that the English version of the new university's name was "remarkably similar" to that of Osaka University, adding, "It will cause confusion among our students, and work as a great obstacle for the future of both universities, which are reaching out to the world."

University of Osaka Prefecture 
UOP was originally established in 1949 as Naniwa University (: Naniwa is the classical name for Osaka) by mingling several national and public technical colleges. Among them was Osaka National College of Engineering. Since then the faculties in the field of engineering have been very competitive. In 1955 the university was renamed University of Osaka Prefecture (Japanese name for the university has not been changed since 1955).

The history of the precedent colleges of Naniwa University (NU) is as follows:

In 1883, the prefectural government founded the  attached to Osaka Prefectural Medical School. In 1942, during World War II, the course for Veterinary Medicine was reorganized into Osaka Higher School of Veterinary Medicine, which was renamed Osaka College of Veterinary Medicine and Animal Husbandry in 1945. This prefectural college, together with Osaka Agricultural College (established in 1944 in Ikeda), constituted NU Faculty of Agriculture (now OPU Graduate School of Life and Environmental Sciences/School of Life and Environmental Sciences).

The main origin was founded as Osaka National Higher School of Engineering in 1939, which was renamed Osaka National College of Engineering in 1944. Its site is now the main (Nakamozu) campus of OPU. The college was merged with four prefectural technical colleges to constitute NU Faculty of Engineering (now OPU Graduate School of Engineering/School of Engineering). In 1950, the two of the former prefectural colleges constituted Junior Technical College Division (one campus in Neyagawa and the other in Yodogawa-ku, Osaka. Neyagawa campus was reorganized into Osaka Prefectural College of Technology [] in 1962, while Yodogawa campus was later abolished).

Still other origin was established as Osaka Youth Normal School in 1944. This teachers college constituted NU Faculty of Education, which was later abolished and reorganized into Division of Liberal Arts (now OPU Faculty of Liberal Arts and Sciences).

The  was a junior college in Mihara-ku, Sakai. It was established in 1953, and closed in 1964. It offered courses in agriculture and food chemistry.

Osaka Women's University 
OWU was established in 1949 by developing Osaka Prefecture Women's College, which was established in 1924 under old educational systems (the second oldest public women's college in Japan). Its campus was originally located in Sumiyoshi-ku, Osaka. In 1976, the university was moved to Sakai. The campus (abolished in March 2007) was next to Daisen-kofun (supposed to be the tomb of Emperor Nintoku).

OWU at first had one faculty: Faculty of Liberal Arts and Education, which included:
Course for Japanese Literature
Course for English Literature
Course for Social Welfare
Course for Life Science

In 1999 Faculty of Liberal Arts and Education was reorganized into two faculties:
Faculty of Humanities and Social Sciences
Faculty of Science

Osaka Prefecture College of Nursing 
OPCN was founded as Osaka Prefecture Junior College of Nursing in 1978. Its campus was located in Sumiyoshi-ku, Osaka. In 1994, the junior college developed into Osaka Prefecture College of Nursing (four-year course, located in Habikino, Osaka).

Graduate schools 
Engineering
Life and Environmental Sciences
Science
Economics
Humanities and Social Sciences
Nursing (in Habikino Campus)

Undergraduate schools 
Engineering
Life and Environmental Sciences
Science
Economics
Humanities and Social Sciences
Comprehensive Rehabilitation
Liberal Arts and Sciences
Nursing (in Habikino Campus)

Campus life
OPU has one of the largest campus areas in Japan, and it has a very nice relaxing atmosphere especially in the parks where children often come to play during holidays. There are four cafeterias which are popular among the students and also the professors.

OPU is specially superior in the engineering science field. All information about classes and student's results are administered using an IT System and there are many computers for students to use freely.

OPU has four school festivals namely "Yuko festival", "Tanabata festival", "Anju festival" and "Shirasagi festival."
The Yuko festival is held in May, where many freshmen set up refreshment booths and make friends in this festival, since "Yuko" means "friendship" in Japanese. The Shirasagi festival is held in November and is a big festival that has been a tradition for more than 60 years. Every year, in this festival there are many booths and four stages for some events, where famous singers and artists are invited to perform. Of the refreshment booths, the one selling "Churros" is the most popular. Each festival, many people come and check out the booths and enjoy the events and OPU.

OPU has two large famous gates: Nakamozu gate and Shirasagi gate.
Those gates are used by most people who go to OPU.
OPU has facilities such as library, U Function hall and grassy areas where people can have picnics, so in weekdays most students enter the university through those gates in order to take lessons, and in the weekends, people who live near OPU enter through those gates in order to play or just walk around in the parks inside of the university.

Academic rankings

Evaluation from Business World

See also 
 Technical Junior College University of Osaka Prefecture

References

External links 
  

 
Educational institutions established in 1888
Educational institutions established in 1949
Educational institutions established in 2005
Public universities in Japan
1949 establishments in Japan
Sakai, Osaka
Kansai Collegiate American Football League